Nikita Magaloff (26 December 1992) was a Georgian-Russian pianist.

He was born in Saint Petersburg to a Georgian noble family named Maghalashvili. Magaloff and his family left Russia in 1918 for Finland. His musical interest first stimulated by family friend Serge Prokofiev, he studied with Alexander Siloti before going to Paris, where he studied with Isidor Philipp, chair of the piano department at the Paris Conservatory. He numbered Ravel among his friends there, who, when he graduated in 1929, said 'In Magaloff a great, a truly extraordinary musician is born.'

He was best known for his espousal of the music of Chopin and was accustomed to perform the complete piano works in series of six recitals. He was the first to record Chopin's complete works. While these recordings have been criticised for their failure to plumb the depths of Chopin's works, they were innovative for their textual fidelity and unsentimentality. Magaloff, for example, preferred and recorded Chopin's own manuscript versions of the waltzes rather than the familiar versions published posthumously by Julian Fontana.

Magaloff's playing carried the hallmarks of Philipp's elegant, refined style, though he himself rejected the sentimental interpretations of Philipp's generation (he was especially critical of Paderewski whom he believed had "falsified Chopin"). He once described himself to the critic and writer Piero Rattalino as 'a vieux style pianist'.

His playing, however, underwent a change in his later years, becoming more passionate, daring and challenging. He remarked, in an interview with Eugenio Scalfari "at the age of seventy, I have come to the conclusion that only the sentiment and fear of death can induce an immoderate passion for life." His last recordings bear eloquent tribute to this "immoderate passion for life".

In 1949 he took over his friend and colleague Dinu Lipatti's master class at the Geneva Conservatory after Lipatti became too ill to teach (Lipatti died the following year at age 33). Magaloff continued regular teaching until 1960, when the demands of his concert career took priority, and he toured in the United States, South America, Japan, Israel, South Africa, and throughout Europe including Russia and Scandinavia. He still gave occasional master-classes, and took part in juries at international piano competitions. In 1982 and 1987 he served on the jury of the Paloma O'Shea Santander International Piano Competition.

Among his many pupils were the pianists Martha Argerich, Maria Tipo, Ingrid Haebler and Valery Sigalevitch, and the organist Lionel Rogg.

Nikita Magaloff was married to Irene, the daughter of the violinist Joseph Szigeti with whom he had established his international reputation in concerts before the war interrupted his career.  He died in Vevey, Switzerland on 26 December 1992.

References

External links 

 

Russian classical pianists
Male classical pianists
Russian people of Georgian descent
Nobility of Georgia (country)
Russian nobility
1912 births
1992 deaths
Pupils of Isidor Philipp
20th-century classical pianists
20th-century Russian male musicians
Soviet pianists